The Alemaan Mosque is a mosque in Sana'a, Yemen. It lies in the eastern part of the city, southeast of Revolution Hospital and northwest of Al Tawheed Mosque, near Al Thawra School and police station.

See also
 Islam in Yemen
 List of mosques in Yemen

References

Mosques in Sanaa